The whiteband goby (Paedovaricus imswe) is a species of ray-finned fish from the family Gobiidae. It has only been recorded from two sites, the Eleuthera Islands in the Bahamas and Carrie Bow Cay in Belize.

References

Gobiidae
Monotypic fish genera
Fish described in 1981